The British Industries Fair was an exhibition centre in Birmingham, England.

The large complex of buildings was built in 1920 and was situated between Castle Bromwich Aerodrome and the railway line. For two weeks every year it was the most visited attraction in the country. In 1933, the first diesel locomotive arrived for display at the BIF. The final B.I.F was on 6 to 17 May 1957.
The associated aerodrome, which often showed air displays, closed with the final flight on 31 March 1958.

The nearby Castle Bromwich railway station received many important visitors for the BIF, including King George V and Queen Mary in 1928, the Duke of York, Princess Mary and Lord Lascelles. They were often entertained afterwards by the Bradfords at Castle Bromwich Hall.

The site was sold in 1960, along with that of the airfield. The buildings and the sites were cleared for the construction of the Castle Vale housing estate. The BIF was replaced by the National Exhibition Centre in 1976, 19 years after its demise.

References 

  (for coordinates)

External links 

"Adopt - adapt and improve. Prince of Wales - Britain's best 'Ambassador of Trade' - at British Industries' Fair." - Pathe newsreel, 23 February 1927
 Britain Opens Her Shop Window, 1950 (Pathé newsreel)
 British Industries Fair, 1953 (Pathé newsreel)
 British Industries Fair, 1957 (Pathé newsreel outtakes)

Buildings and structures completed in 1920
Exhibition and conference centres in England
Former buildings and structures in England
Buildings and structures in Birmingham, West Midlands
History of Birmingham, West Midlands
20th-century architecture in the United Kingdom